Émile Eddé (5 May 1886 – 28 September 1949) was a Lebanese Maronite Christian lawyer and politician who served as the President of Lebanon for twelve days in 1943.

Early life and education
Eddé is a member of a family that originates from Beirut which participated in the Lebanese politics mainly during the Ma'anids and Shihabs rule. He was born in Damascus, where his father, Ibrahim Eddé, was working as a translator in the French Consulate. He attended Saint Joseph University, and moved to France to study law in Aix-en-Provence, in 1902, and graduated three years later. Because of his father's health conditions, he was forced to return to Beirut in 1909, before submitting his doctoral thesis. In 1912, he was appointed as a lawyer for the French Consulate in Beirut.

Before the First World War, he sought to separate Mount Lebanon from the Ottoman Empire, for which he was sentenced to death. However, Edde was able to escape and took refuge in Alexandria. He participated in the establishment of the Eastern Unit in the French Army, which consisted of Lebanese and Syrian volunteers. During this period, he maintained contacts, with the French authorities, via his brother Joseph, residing in France.

Political career 
During the period of the French Mandate in which the Republic of Lebanon functioned under the authority of a French High Commissioner, Eddé served as the speaker of the Parliament from October 1924 to January 1925, prime minister of Lebanon from 11 October 1929 to 25 March 1930 and as the president of Lebanon from 1936 to 1941.  On 11 November 1943, following the act of the Lebanese legislature in abolishing the Mandate, the High Commissioner installed Eddé as president.  Ten days later, however, under pressure from France's other Allies in World War II, the French removed Eddé from office and restored the government of Bechara El Khoury on 21 November., and briefly in 1943. He also founded and led the Lebanese National Bloc party. He was succeeded as party leader by his son Raymond Eddé.

References

External links 

1886 births
1949 deaths
Aix-Marseille University alumni
Lebanese Maronites
Prime Ministers of Lebanon
Presidents of Lebanon
Legislative speakers of Lebanon
Syrian Maronites
National Bloc (Lebanon) politicians
Political party founders
Lebanon under French rule
Maronites from the Ottoman Empire
20th-century people from the Ottoman Empire
19th-century people from the Ottoman Empire
Lebanese independence activists